Mealybugs are insects in the family Pseudococcidae, unarmored scale insects found in moist, warm habitats. Many species are considered pests as they feed on plant juices of greenhouse plants, house plants and subtropical trees and also act as a vector for several plant diseases. Some ants live in symbiotic relationships with them, protecting them from predators and feeding off the honeydew which they excrete.

Description

Mealybugs are sexually dimorphic: females appear as nymphs, exhibiting reduced morphology, and lack wings, although unlike many female scale insects, they often retain legs and can move. Males are smaller, gnat-like and have wings. Since mealybugs (as well as all other Hemiptera) are hemimetabolous insects, they do not undergo complete metamorphosis in the true sense of the word. However, male mealybugs do exhibit a radical change during their life cycle, changing from wingless, ovoid nymphs to wasp-like flying adults.

Mealybug females feed on plant sap, normally in roots or other crevices, and in a few cases the bottoms of stored fruit. They attach themselves to the plant and secrete a powdery wax layer (hence the name "mealy" bug) used for protection while they suck the plant juices. In Asia, mango mealybug is considered a major menace for the mango crop. The males on the other hand are short-lived as they do not feed at all as adults and only live to fertilize the females. Male citrus mealy bugs fly to the females and resemble fluffy gnats.

Some species of mealybug lay their eggs in the same waxy layer used for protection in quantities of 50–100; other species are born directly from the female.

The most serious pests are mealybugs that feed on citrus; other species damage sugarcane, grapes, pineapple (Jahn et al. 2003), coffee trees, cassava, ferns, cacti, gardenias, papaya, mulberry, sunflower and orchids. Mealybugs only tend to be serious pests in the presence of ants because the ants protect them from predators and parasites. Mealybugs are also a vector of viruses in grapevines, spreading grapevine leafroll and grapevine red blotch viruses. Mealybugs also infest some species of carnivorous plant such as Sarracenia (pitcher plants); in such cases it is difficult to eradicate them without repeated applications of insecticide such as diazinon. Small infestations may not inflict significant damage. In larger amounts though, they can induce leaf drop. In recent years, some of the mealybug species have become invasive pests in localities posing a great problem to the new agro-ecosystems. In India, Withania somnifera plant have been reported as a new reservoir host for an invasive mealybug species Phenacoccus solenopsis.

Some mealybugs of the Hypogeococcus are used as biological pest controls of invasive cacti in South Africa, including Harrisia balansae, H. martinii, and Opuntia cespitosa.

Fossil specimens of genus Acropyga ants have been recovered from the Burdigalian stage Dominican amber deposits and several individuals are preserved carrying the extinct mealybug genus Electromyrmococcus. These fossils represent the oldest record of the symbiosis between mealybugs and Acropyga species ants.

Control methods
Pyrethroids such as permethrin, bifenthrin or cyfluthrin can be used to control mealybugs.

Some gardeners use green lacewing (Chrysopidae) larvae to control mealybug infestations, as the larval lacewings are voracious predators of aphids and other small insects.

Metabolism
Mealybugs have a highly sophisticated metabolism that involves not one but two bacterial endosymbionts, one inside the other. The endosymbionts make essential amino acids that the mealybug is now unable to acquire directly from its diet. Genetically, mealybugs rely on a "mosaic" of metabolic pathways in which proteins are transported across membranes between what were once independent organisms.

Genera

 Acaciacoccus
 Acinicoccus
 Acrochordonus
 Adelosoma
 Agastococcus
 Albertinia
 Allomyrmococcus
 Allotrionymus
 Amonostherium
 Anaparaputo
 Anisococcus
 Annulococcus
 Anthelococcus
 Antonina
 Antoninella
 Antoninoides
 Apodastococcus
 Artemicoccus
 Asaphococcus
 Asphodelococcus
 Asteliacoccus
 Atriplicicoccus
 Atrococcus
 Australicoccus
 Australiputo
 Balanococcus
 Bessenayla
 Bimillenia
 Birendracoccus
 Boninococcus
 Boreococcus
 Bouhelia
 Brasiliputo
 Brevennia
 Brevicoccus
 Callitricoccus
 Calyptococcus
 Cannococcus
 Capitisetella
 Cataenococcus
 Chaetococcus
 Chaetotrionymus
 Chileputo
 Chlorococcus
 Chnaurococcus
 Chorizococcus
 Chryseococcus
 Cintococcus
 Circaputo
 Cirnecoccus
 Clavicoccus
 Coccidohystrix
 Coccura
 Coleococcus
 Colombiacoccus
 Conicosoma
 Conulicoccus
 Coorongia
 Cormiococcus
 Criniticoccus
 Crisicoccus
 Crocydococcus
 Cryptoripersia
 Cucullococcus
 Cyperia
 Cypericoccus
 Cyphonococcus
 Dawa
 Delococcus
 Delottococcus
 Densispina
 Discococcus
 Distichlicoccus
 Diversicrus
 Drymococcus
 Dysmicoccus
 Eastia
 Ehrhornia
 Electromyrmococcus †
 Epicoccus
 Erimococcus
 Eriocorys
 Erioides
 Erium
 Eucalyptococcus
 Eumirococcus
 Eumyrmococcus
 Eupeliococcus
 Euripersia
 Eurycoccus
 Exilipedronia
 Farinococcus
 Ferrisia
 Ferrisicoccus
 Fijicoccus
 Fonscolombia
 Formicococcus
 Gallulacoccus
 Geococcus
 Glycycnyza
 Gomezmenoricoccus
 Gouxia
 Greenoripersia
 Grewiacoccus
 Hadrococcus
 Heliococcus
 Heterococcopsis
 Heterococcus
 Heteroheliococcus
 Hippeococcus
 Hopefoldia
 Humococcus
 Hypogeococcus
 Iberococcus
 Idiococcus
 Indococcus
 Inopicoccus
 Ityococcus
 Kenmorea
 Kermicus
 Kiritshenkella
 Lachnodiella
 Lachnodiopsis
 Lacombia
 Laingiococcus
 Laminicoccus
 Lankacoccus
 Lantanacoccus
 Lenania
 Leptococcus
 Leptorhizoecus
 Liucoccus
 Lomatococcus
 Londiania
 Longicoccus
 Maconellicoccus
 Macrocepicoccus
 Maculicoccus
 Madacanthococcus
 Madagasia
 Madangiacoccus
 Madeurycoccus
 Malaicoccus
 Malekoccus
 Mammicoccus
 Marendellea
 Mascarenococcus
 Maskellococcus
 Mauricoccus
 Melanococcus
 Metadenopsis
 Metadenopus
 Miconicoccus
 Mirococcopsis
 Mirococcus
 Miscanthicoccus
 Misericoccus
 Mizococcus
 Mollicoccus
 Mombasinia
 Moystonia
 Mutabilicoccus
 Nairobia
 Natalensia
 Neochavesia
 Neoclavicoccus
 Neoripersia
 Neosimmondsia
 Neotrionymus
 Nesococcus
 Nesopedronia
 Nesticoccus
 Nipaecoccus
 Novonilacoccus
 Octococcus
 Odacoccus
 Ohiacoccus
 Oracella
 Orococcus
 Orstomicoccus
 Oxyacanthus
 Palaucoccus
 Palmicultor
 Paludicoccus
 Pandanicola
 Papuacoccus
 Paracoccus
 Paradiscococcus
 Paradoxococcus
 Paraferrisia
 Paramococcus
 Paramonostherium
 Paramyrmococcus
 Parapaludicoccus
 Parapedronia
 Paraputo
 Pararhodania
 Paratrionymus
 Parkermicus
 Paulianodes
 Pedrococcus
 Pedronia
 Peliococcopsis
 Peliococcus
 Pelionella
 Pellizzaricoccus
 Penthococcus
 Peridiococcus
 Phenacoccus
 Phyllococcus
 Pilococcus
 Planococcoides
 Planococcus
 Pleistocerarius
 Plotococcus
 Poecilococcus
 Polystomophora
 Porisaccus
 Porococcus
 Prorhizoecus
 Prorsococcus
 Pseudantonina
 Pseudococcus
 Pseudorhizoecus
 Pseudorhodania
 Pseudoripersia
 Pseudotrionymus
 Puto
 Pygmaeococcus
 Quadrigallicoccus
 Rastrococcus
 Renicaula
 Rhizoecus
 Rhodania
 Ripersia
 Ritsemia
 Rosebankia
 Saccharicoccus
 Sarococcus
 Scaptococcus
 Seabrina
 Serrolecanium
 Seyneria
 Spartinacoccus
 Sphaerococcus
 Spilococcus
 Spinococcus
 Stachycoccus
 Stemmatomerinx
 Stipacoccus
 Strandanna
 Stricklandina
 Strombococcus
 Synacanthococcus
 Syrmococcus
 Tangicoccus
 Tasmanicoccus
 Telocorys
 Tibetococcus
 Tomentocera
 Trabutina
 Tridiscus
 Trimerococcus
 Trionymus
 Trochiscococcus
 Turbinococcus
 Tylococcus
 Tympanococcus
 Ventrispina
 Villosicoccus
 Volvicoccus
 Vryburgia
 Xenococcus
 Yudnapinna

References

Further reading
 Jahn, G. C. and J. W. Beardsley (1994).  "Big-headed ants, Pheidole megacephala: Interference with the biological control of gray pineapple mealybugs".  In D.F. Williams [ed.] Exotic Ants: Biology, Impact and Control of Introduced Species.  Boulder, Col.: Westview Press, 199–205. .
 Jahn, G. C. and J. W. Beardsley (1998). "Presence/absence sampling of mealybugs, ants, and major predators in pineapple".  J. Plant Protection in the Tropics 11(1):73–79.
 Jahn, Gary C., J. W. Beardsley, and H. González-Hernández (2003). "A review of the association of ants with mealybug wilt disease of pineapple". Proceedings of the Hawaiian Entomological Society. 36:9–28.

External links
 NCIPM (National Centre for Integrated Pest Management) – Cotton Mealybugs
 Mealy bugs Pseudococcus spp.—BBC gardening advice
 CISR – Vine Mealybug—Center for Invasive Species Research summary on Vine Mealybug
 On the University of Florida / Institute of Food and Agricultural Sciences Featured Creatures website:
 Hypogeococcus pungens
 Nipaecoccus nipae, coconut mealybug

 
Agricultural pest insects
Insect pests of ornamental plants
Insect vectors of plant pathogens